is a Japanese footballer currently playing as a winger for Cerezo Osaka.

Career statistics

Club

Notes

References

External links

1996 births
Living people
Japanese footballers
Komazawa University alumni
Association football midfielders
J3 League players
Roasso Kumamoto players
J2 League players
Montedio Yamagata players
J1 League players
Cerezo Osaka players